Ali Tajik (born August 1, 1976 in Iran) is a retired Iranian Taekwondo athlete who won a silver medal at the 2001 world Taekwondo cup and another silver medal at the 2005 World Taekwondo Championships.
In the latter competition, he managed to reach the final and was only defeated by Steven Lopez who is one of the greatest champions of this sport.

References 

Iranian male taekwondo practitioners
Living people
1976 births
Universiade silver medalists for Iran
Universiade medalists in taekwondo
Medalists at the 2003 Summer Universiade
21st-century Iranian people